Huastecacris is a genus of spur-throated grasshoppers in the family Acrididae. There are at least four described species in Huastecacris, found in Mexico.

Species
These four species belong to the genus Huastecacris:
 Huastecacris alexandri Barrientos-Lozano, Buzzetti, Rocha-Sánchez & Méndez-Gómez, 2010
 Huastecacris fariensis Barrientos-Lozano, Medina & Rocha-Sánchez, 2009
 Huastecacris truncatipennis (Scudder, 1897)
 Huastecacris zenoni Fontana & Buzzetti, 2007

References

External links

 

Acrididae